My Name Is Uncle Groucho, You Win a Fat Cigar is a computer game developed and published by Automata UK for the ZX Spectrum in 1983. Groucho was designed by Mel Croucher who was perhaps better known for his later works Deus Ex Machina and ID.

The game takes the form of a text (augmented by primitive "graphics") adventure where the player seeks out Groucho (based on Groucho Marx), who gives the player a series of clues as to the identity of a famous film star. If the player guesses correctly another clue to a further star is provided. The name of this additional star could be mailed to Automata UK for entry into a prize draw to take place on 1 June 1984. First prize was a trip to Hollywood on Concorde to meet the actor identified, with a return trip on the QE2.

The competition was won by Phil Daley, who correctly identified Mickey Mouse and provided the winning pun slogan "There's no blood in our games, it's all tomata sauce".

External links 
Crash magazine short review from 1984

References

1983 video games
Adventure games
Automata UK games
Cultural depictions of the Marx Brothers
Marx Brothers
Single-player video games
Video games based on real people
Video games developed in the United Kingdom
ZX Spectrum games
ZX Spectrum-only games